Pyatho is the tenth month of the traditional Burmese calendar.

Festivals and observances
Karen New Year (first day of Pyatho)
Royal equestrian festivals
Pagoda festivals
Ananda Pagoda Festival, Bagan

Pyatho symbols
Flower: Clematis smilacifolia

References

See also
Burmese calendar
Festivals of Burma

Burmese culture
Months of the Burmese calendar